George Robert "Tod" Collins (30 January 1876 – 24 August 1942) was an Australian rules footballer who played for the Essendon Football Club in the Victorian Football League (VFL).

Family
The son of George Washington Collins (1852-1916), and Mary Collins (1851-1941), née McConnell, George Robert Collins was born at Hobart, Tasmania on 30 January 1876: although his given name was George, he was always known as "Tod Collins".

He married Ada Catherine McKinnell (1875-1961) on 24 April 1912 in Hawthorn, Victoria.

Football

Essendon (VFA)
Collins played mostly as a half back flanker and was a strong marker of the ball.

Essendon (VFL)
Playing on the half-forward flank, he was one of the 20 who played for Essendon in its first VFL match against Geelong, at Corio Oval, on 8 May 1897:  Jim Anderson, Edward "Son" Barry, Arthur Cleghorn, Tod Collins, Jim Darcy, Charlie Forbes, Johnny Graham, Joe Groves, George Hastings, Ted Kinnear, George Martin, Bob McCormick, Pat O'Loughlin, Gus Officer, Ned Officer, Bert Salkeld, George Stuckey, George Vautin, Norman Waugh, and Harry Wright.

Collins was a member of the inaugural VFL premiership side with Essendon in 1897. During his career he was chosen to represent the Victoria interstate team, appearing in games against South Australia in 1900, 1901 and 1902.

He captained Essendon in 1901 and 1902, the former a premiership team.

Preston (VFA)
In 1906 he became captain-coach of Victorian Football Association club Preston, but retired five games into the season.

Death
He died at Malvern, Victoria on 24 August 1942.

Notes

References
 Maplestone, M., Flying Higher: History of the Essendon Football Club 1872–1996, Essendon Football Club, (Melbourne), 1996.

External links

 
 
 Tod Collins, at The VFA Project.
 Essendon Football Club profile

1876 births
1942 deaths
Australian rules footballers from Hobart
Ballarat Football Club players
Essendon Football Club (VFA) players
Essendon Football Club players
Essendon Football Club Premiership players
Preston Football Club (VFA) players
Preston Football Club (VFA) coaches
Two-time VFL/AFL Premiership players